The Transportation Plan was a plan for strategic bombing during World War II against bridges, rail centres, including marshalling yards and repair shops in France with the goal of limiting the German military response to the invasion of France in June 1944.

The plan was based on those of Air Marshal Tedder and the "Overlord air plan" of Air Chief Marshal Leigh-Mallory, The plan was devised by Professor Solly Zuckerman, an advisor to the Air Ministry, to destroy transportation in Occupied France during the "preparatory period" for Operation Overlord so Germany would be unable to respond effectively to the invasion.

The air campaign, carried out by the bombers of the RAF and USAAF crippled the German rail networks in France and played a crucial role in disrupting German logistics and reinforcements  to the invasion area.

Plan and operations
Air Officer Commanding (AOC)  RAF Bomber Command Marshal Arthur Harris did not want to divert his bomber force away from their strategic campaign against German industry (known to the Germans as the Defence of the Reich campaign). However, he resigned himself early on to supporting Overlord as early as 17 February 1944 while his force was engaged in the bombing campaign against Berlin.
On 6 March 1944, Charles Portal ordered attacks on the marshalling yards at Trappes, Aulnoye, Le Mans, Amiens, Lougeau, Courtrai and Laon. Control of all air operations was transferred to Eisenhower on 14 April at noon.

Attacks made under the Transportation Plan

Results
The effectiveness of the Transport Plan was evident in German reports at the time. A German Air Ministry (RLM) report of 13 June 1944 stated: "The raids...have caused the breakdown of all main lines; the coast defences have been cut off from the supply bases in the interior...producing a situation which threatens to have serious consequences" and that although "transportation of essential supplies for the civilian population have been completely...large scale strategic movement of German troops by rail is practically impossible at the present time and must remain so while attacks are maintained at their present intensity".

Notes

References
 Buckley, John. Air Power in the Age of Total War. UCL Press. London. 1998. . 
 Darlow, Stephen. D-Day Bombers, The Veteran's Story: RAF Bomber Command and the US Eighth Air Force Support to the Normandy Invasion, 1944. Grub Street, London. 2004. 
 de Jong, Ivo. Mission 376: Battle Over the Reich, May 28, 1944. Stackpole Books. 2012
 Frankland, Noble (2006). The Strategic Air Offensive Against Germany, 1939-1945, Volume III, Part 5: Victory. Naval and Military Press. .  
 Frankland, Noble (1961). The Strategic Air Offensive Against Germany, 1939-1945, Volume II, Part 4: Endeavour. Her Majesty's Stationery Office. 
 Gooderson, Ian. Air Power at the Battlefront: Allied Close Air Support, 1943-1945. Frank Cass 2005. 
 Hall, Cargill (1998). Case Studies In Strategic Bombardment. Air Force History and Museums Program. . 
 Mets, David R. Master of Airpower: General Carl A. Spaatz. Presidio Press. 1997.  

World War II strategic bombing
Aerial operations and battles of World War II
Military logistics of World War II